Between Us Barons (Swedish: Oss baroner emellan) is a 1939 Swedish comedy film directed by Ivar Johansson and starring Adolf Jahr, Birgit Tengroth and Gösta Cederlund. It was inspired by the British novel Following Ann by Kenneth R. G. Browne.

It was shot at the Gärdet Studios in Stockholm. The film's sets were designed by the art director Arthur Spjuth.

Synopsis
A baron returns to Sweden after many years in Argentina. Soon after arriving, his luggage is stolen by a confidence trickster who masquerades as the baron in order to gain an invitation to the estate of a wealthy couple. Things become more complicated when the baron himself turns up, also in disguise.

Cast
 Adolf Jahr as Gustaf Adolf Leijoncloo
 Birgit Tengroth as Inga
 Gösta Cederlund as Hektor Blomqvist
 Tollie Zellman as Agnes, hans hustru
 Elsa Desolneux as Karin, deras dotter
 Thor Modéen as Vilgot Sällberg
 Magnus Kesster as Jönsson-Hammarlöf-Bratt
 Hilding Gavle as Hansson, betjänt
 Gull Natorp as Tant Victoria

References

Bibliography 
 Qvist, Per Olov & von Bagh, Peter. Guide to the Cinema of Sweden and Finland. Greenwood Publishing Group, 2000.

External links 
 

1939 films
Swedish comedy films
1939 comedy films
1930s Swedish-language films
Films directed by Ivar Johansson
Swedish black-and-white films
Films based on British novels
1930s Swedish films